Frank Lenz (born 18 June 1967 in San Leandro, California) is a drummer from Southern California who has done work for many bands and artists, including Richard Swift, The Weepies, Everest, Pedro The Lion, Starflyer 59, Lassie Foundation, Duraluxe, Map, Charity Empressa, and his own solo work.

Biography
Frank Lenz started taking drum lessons when he was eight years old. A natural, he was soon working as a session musician. After playing with several indie bands, Lenz developed his original work as a solo musician, mixing the pop of Burt Bacharach with power rock like Steely Dan, jazz fusion, and Stevie Wonder-style R&B.
"Playing drums is all I ever wanted to do," Lenz has said, and by the age of 13, he began his career as studio drummer.  He has since played on too many records to list, and toured / played / recorded with an extremely long list of bands.  Most recently he's taken to creating film soundtracks, and focusing on his own music.  He wrote and recorded the soundtrack for the film 'Holy Rollers', which gathered a lot of press, including a feature at This American Life, as well as segments on The Colbert Report, Huffington Post, NY Times, etc.

In December 2003, American webzine Somewhere Cold voted Frank Lenz Artist of the Year on their 2003 Somewhere Cold Awards Hall of Fame list. A year later, in December 2004, Somewhere Cold ranked his album Conquest Slaughter No. 2 on their 2004 Somewhere Cold Awards Hall of Fame list.

Discography

Full Length Albums
 The Hot Stuff (2001, Northern Records)
 The Last Temptation of Frank Lenz (2003, Independent)
 Conquest Slaughter (2004, Velvet Blue Music)
 VileLenz & Thieves (2006, Hidden Agenda/Parasol Records)
 Strictly Background : Original Motion Picture Soundtrack (2009, Velvet Blue Music)
 Holy Rollers : Original Motion Picture Soundtrack (2012, Velvet Blue Music)
 Water Tiger (2013, Velvet Blue Music)

EPs
Vacation (2012, Velvet Blue Music)
Pyramid (2018, Independent)
Hot Painless City (2020, Velvet Blue Music)

Singles
Brothers Who Are Breathing (2005, ABC DOCUMENTATION)
Summer's Coming Soon (2014, Velvet Blue Music)

Bands 

Fold Zandura
Lassie Foundation, The
Starflyer 59
Pony Express
Headphones (band)
Shepherd (with Ronnie Martin of Joy Electric)
Mortal
Cush
Charity Empressa

Album contributions 

Calico Sunset -  Deep, Deep Paranoia
Calicoes, The - Custom Acceleration
Jared Colinger - Favourite Hallucination EP, Daughters & Daggers (string arrangements)
Cooper, Amy -  Mirrors
Charity Empressa - Charity Empressa, The Skin of Whippets 
CUSH - Cush/New Sound, Cush EP
Daniel Amos - Mr. Buechner's Dream (additional keyboards & percussion)
Duraluxe - The Suitcase
Everett, Wayne - KingsQueens
Fold Zandura - Re:turn, Ultraforever
Headphones - Headphones (drums)
Kat Jones - Building EP, La Rosa, La Calavera
Lassie Foundation, The - Pacifico, El Dorado (engineer), I Duel Sioux And The Ale Of Saturn
Lewis, Crystal - Holy, Holy, Holy, More
MAP - Secrets By the Highway, Think Like an Owner
Max, Kevin -  The Imposter
Nelson, Holly - Leaving the Yard
O.C. Supertones - Chase the Sun(drums),Loud and Clear (drums)
Plankeye - Relocation
Pony Express - Becoming What You Hate, Fraud EP, "Odd Balls"
Roper - Brace Yourself for the Mediocre (drums)
Shepherd - Committing To Tape (drums)
Starflyer 59 - Leave Here a Stranger (additionals), Old (drums, bg vocals), I Am the Portuguese Blues (drums), The Last Laurel (drum kit), Talking Voice vs. Singing Voice (drum kit, string arrangements)
Swift, Richard - Walking Without Effort, The Novelist
The Weepies - Hideaway, Be My Thrill
The Dingees - Sundown to Midnight and The Crucial Conspiracy

References

External links
   Velvet Blue Music
  - Velvet Blue Music Press Page on Frank
 The Cosmic Door - Frank Lenz interview (2006)
 Decemberhotel - Frank Lenz interview (2005)
 Frank Lenz interview on Somewhere Cold (2003)
 MySpace: Frank Lenz, accessed 12 October 2006
 

1967 births
Living people
American audio engineers
Musicians from California
20th-century American drummers
American male drummers
Pedro the Lion members
Headphones (band) members
20th-century American male musicians
Starflyer 59 members